Schnapper may refer to:

 Antoine Schnapper (1933–2004) French art historian
 Dominique Schnapper (born 1934), French scholar and professor of sociology
 Schnapper Rock , a suburb of North Shore, New Zealand
 Schnapper Island, original name of Snapper Island (New South Wales), Australia
 A local name for Australasian snapper in Victoria, Australia
 A cultivar of the woody shrub Banksia spinulosa

See also
 Snapper (disambiguation)